Lauri Fredrik Rechardt (born 24 April 1965) is a Finnish sailor, educated lawyer. He competed in the Finn event at the 1988 Summer Olympics. He is the brother of Esko Rechardt, a gold medalist at the 1980 Summer Olympics.

Currently Rechardt works as a lawyer at IFPI in London.

References

1965 births
Living people
Sportspeople from Helsinki
Finnish male sailors (sport)
Olympic sailors of Finland
Sailors at the 1988 Summer Olympics – Finn
20th-century Finnish lawyers
21st-century Finnish lawyers